The Salakta Archaeological Museum is a Tunisian archaeological museum, located in Salakta. Established in 1980, it includes archaeological works from the ancient Sullectum, especially terra cotta, a mosaic pavement representing a gigantic African lion, and amphorae from other sites in the Sahel, Tunisia.

See also

African archaeology
Culture of Tunisia
List of museums in Tunisia

Museums with year of establishment missing
Archaeological museums in Tunisia
Mahdia Governorate
Museums established in 1980
1980 establishments in Tunisia